Ruddy Nelhomme (born 15 March 1972) is a Guadeloupean-French former professional basketball player and coach.

Coaching career

Club coaching career
Since 2007, Nelhomme has coached Poitiers Basket 86.

National team coaching career
Since 2010, Nelhomme has been the assistant coach of the senior French national basketball team.

References

External links
 Eurobasket.com profile
 RealGM profile

Videos
 ITW Ruddy Nelhomme Interview (Youtube.com video) 

1972 births
Living people
Cholet Basket coaches
French basketball coaches
French men's basketball players
French people of Guadeloupean descent
Guadeloupean basketball coaches
People from Pointe-à-Pitre